Banuri may refer to:
 Banoori, a family name
 Banuri, Himachal Pradesh, a village in India

See also 
 
 Allama Banuri Town, a neighbourhood in Karachi, Pakistan